Daniel Núñez Aguiar (born 12 September 1958 in Santiago de Cuba) is a Cuban weightlifter.

He won a gold medal in the bantamweight class at the 1979 Pan American Games in San Juan and at the 1980 Summer Olympics in Moscow.

Núñez set a world record for the snatch at the 1982 Central American and Caribbean Games.

At the 1983 Pan American Games Núñez and three other lifters were stripped of their medals for use of anabolic steroids.

References

External links

1958 births
Living people
Sportspeople from Santiago de Cuba
Cuban male weightlifters
Olympic weightlifters of Cuba
Weightlifters at the 1976 Summer Olympics
Weightlifters at the 1980 Summer Olympics
Olympic gold medalists for Cuba
Olympic medalists in weightlifting
Medalists at the 1980 Summer Olympics
Pan American Games gold medalists for Cuba
Weightlifters at the 1979 Pan American Games
Weightlifters at the 1983 Pan American Games
Doping cases in weightlifting
Cuban sportspeople in doping cases
Pan American Games medalists in weightlifting
World Weightlifting Championships medalists
Central American and Caribbean Games medalists in weightlifting
Medalists at the 1979 Pan American Games
20th-century Cuban people